Robert Boyle Prize for Analytical Science, formerly called Boyle Medal, is a prize of the Royal Society of Chemistry for Analytical Chemistry.

Not to be confused with the Irish Times Boyle Medal, also awarded in chemistry, or Boyle Higgins Gold Medal of the Institute of Chemistry of Ireland.

It is awarded every two years and is worth £5,000. The prize is named after Robert Boyle and awarded since 1982.

Award Winners 

Winners include:

See also

 List of chemistry awards

References

External links 
 Official Website
 Award Winners

Awards of the Royal Society of Chemistry